St. Charles Parish is a parish located in the U.S. state of Louisiana. At the 2020 census, its population was 52,549. The parish seat is Hahnville and the most populous community is Luling.

The parish was established in 1807, following the Louisiana Purchase by the United States in 1803. It was originally part of the German Coast, an area along the east bank of the Mississippi River that was settled by numerous German pioneers in the 1720s. This was historically an area of sugarcane plantations, but the energy industry is now the economic base of the parish. St. Charles Parish is split by the Mississippi River and includes territory on both sides of the river.

St. Charles Parish is included in the New Orleans-Metairie metropolitan statistical area.

History

17th century
In 1682, French explorers René-Robert Cavelier, Sieur de La Salle and Henri de Tonti traveled the entire length of the Mississippi River and as their expedition passed what is present-day Hahnville on the west bank; they encountered indigenous Quinipissa villagers. In 1699, Pierre Le Moyne d'Iberville, along with his younger brother, Jean-Baptiste Le Moyne de Bienville returned to the area claiming it for France. They found an indigenous Bayagoula settlement near the river’s intersection with a tributary at a site named L’Anse aux Outardes or Bustard’s Cove in present-day New Sarpy on the east bank of the Mississippi River. It was discovered that the Quinapissa had joined the indigenous Mougoulacha and they later moved to the east bank of the river to form one village with the Bayougoula near L’Anse aux Outardes.

18th century
As early as 1718, John Law and the Company of the Indies began recruiting French settlers to settle Louisiana (New France), though not specifically to what would become the German Coast. The early French settlers were not suited or prepared for the harsh conditions in Louisiana. In 1719, Jean-Pierre Pury, a director at the Company of the Indies, proposed recruiting Germans and German-speaking Swiss farmers to Louisiana and that same year with a twenty-five-year charter, Law merged the Company of the West with his Company of the Indies. Also in 1719, a small group of German settlers arrived in the Louisiana French colony and were transported by waterways thirty miles west of New Orleans to a location along the west bank of the Mississippi River, north of Ouachas Lake. This area of German settlers was called les Allemands or the Germans.

In 1720, Germans were recruited in early spring to settle in les Allemands. Roughly four thousand individuals (four hundred and fifty families) mostly from the Rhineland, but also from Baden-Württemberg, Bavaria, Swedish Pomerania, Alsace–Lorraine, Belgium, and Switzerland traveled across France to Lorient in Brittany and then made the voyage to Louisiana on March 7, 1721. The settlers arrived in Old Biloxi on June 4, 1721, and on December 15, 1721, French Governor Bienville issued an order for boats to transport the recently arrived German-speaking settlers including newly named Commandant Charles Frederic d'Arensbourg, born Karl Friedrich von Arensburg, to the already established villages of Hoffen, Marienthal, and Augsburg on the west bank of the Mississippi River. The settlers left for the settlements in January 1722 and of the roughly four thousand individuals that initially began the trip in Europe, when they reached their port of embarkation in March 1722, a Company of the Indies official counted only three hundred and thirty settlers because many of them perished due to the harsh conditions of their long journey to Louisiana. d'Arensbourg’s land grant concession on the west bank of the river near present-day Taft, was named Karlstein after him and with its founding, the original four settlements in "les Allemands" were established. Besides the area being named "les Allemands", the collective name that the settlements were sometimes referred to as was Karlstein, also after Charles Frédérique d'Arensbourg or Karl Friedrich von Arensburg, who was the acknowledged leader of the settlements for more than 55 years.

Over time, "les Allemands" would come to be known as Côté des Allemands or German Coast and is located in present-day St. Charles and St. John the Baptist Parishes. The German Coast Settlement established in 1722 was the third permanent settlement in what is now the state of Louisiana, after Natchitoches (1714) and New Orleans (1718).

Also in 1722, the "La Grand Ouragan" Hurricane devastated the German Coast and many Germans considered leaving. In order to prevent this exodus, Governor Bienville decided to grant the settlement of additional lands to settlers on the west bank in addition to the east bank of the river. Later in 1722 and 1723, some French and German settlers along with newly arrived Canadians moved across the Mississippi River to establish the first east bank settlement at L’Anse aux Outardes or Bustard’s Cove. The tributary at this site connected the Mississippi River to Lake Pontchartrain via a previously discovered system of waterways through the LaBranche Wetlands. The ecclesiastical parish and chapel, La Paroisse de St. Jean des Allemands, was also founded in 1723 in Karlstein.
 
A 1724 census revealed that the German families were not only harvesting enough food and raising enough cattle for their families, but they were bringing their surplus to New Orleans markets. It is apparent from these records that from the beginning of their settlement, German Coast farmers were a major source of food for the city of New Orleans.

The granting of additional lands in 1722 and 1723, led to the founding of the Second German Coast in 1730 and the establishment of officially having settlements on both banks of the Mississippi River. The year 1729 saw the first attack by Native Americans on the German villages. In 1731, as the first decade of settlement on the German Coast ended and the Company of the Indies charter was retrieved by France, Louisiana again became a French colony. The land farmed by settlers on the German Coast technically belonged to the Company of the Indies until France retrieved its charter. After France once again owned the land, more landholders began to petition France for individual ownership of property.

In 1740, the ecclesiastical parish and chapel relocated to the present-day site of the church in Destrehan on the east bank of the Mississippi River. A log cabin structure was built and both the ecclesiastical parish and chapel were renamed St. Charles in honor of St. Charles Borromeo.

The Territory of Louisiana remained under French rule until 1763, when France ceded Louisiana to Spain after losing the Seven Years' War to Great Britain. The French and Indian War was a North American theater of this war. At the beginning of the Spanish colonial period, many Acadians, people of French descent, began arriving in south Louisiana after being expelled by the British from what is now Nova Scotia after the British took over French territory in Canada along with North American territory east of the Mississippi river. The first French Acadian village was established in present-day Wallace in the German Coast. The Germanic settlers of the German Coast and French Acadians of what would become Acadiana thrived alongside each another with French becoming the dominant language. The intermingling and marriage between these two groups and influence from additional groups and cultures led to the formation of what was to become Louisiana Cajun culture.

The early 18th century settlers in the area received land grants from the Spanish or French royal governments, depending upon which country ruled the territory at the time of application. The French style of property allotments was made up of narrow frontage on the river so that each plantation had access to high ground for ground transportation of goods to and from New Orleans and world markets. In addition to ground transportation, goods were mainly shipped by boat on bayous and lakes and also via the Mississippi River. The main house and supporting outbuildings were constructed near the river. The remaining property extended away from the river into the wetlands, where land was cleared for cultivation of sugar cane and indigo. Homes still existing in St. Charles Parish include Destrehan Plantation, Homeplace Plantation House, and Ormond Plantation House. Labranche Plantation no longer exists, but the Creole dependency house, known in French as a garconnière still exists.

19th century
In 1800, Napoleon, the First Consul of the French Republic, regained control over Louisiana for France. Following the Louisiana Purchase in 1803, the Territory of Orleans was established in 1804 and the following year on April 10, 1805, it was divided into twelve counties with one of them being the County of the German Coast. The first courthouse was established in 1804, in a community then known as “St. Charles Courthouse". The town was later renamed Hahnville and became the parish seat.

In 1806, the log cabin St. Charles Chapel in Destrehan burned. That same year, a wood-framed church painted red was built at the site of the former chapel. The church became known as the "Little Red Church". It was a famous riverboat landmark where boat captains traditionally paid off their crews.

In 1807, St. Charles Parish was "officially" established. In 1811, part of the German Coast uprising took place in St. Charles Parish. The first two public schools in St. Charles Parish opened in 1850.

During the American Civil War, three skirmishes took place in St. Charles Parish. They were the "Battle of Hahnville Courthouse", "Skirmish of Boutte Station" and the "Battle of Des Allemands". Louisiana and therefore St. Charles Parish were part of the Fifth Military District during the Reconstruction era from 1865 to 1877.

Our Lady of the Holy Rosary Catholic Church was originally built in 1877 in Taft.

Towards the end of 19th century, ferry regulation throughout the parish would now be implemented with parish oversight.

20th Century
Starting in the 20th Century, the area of the German Coast and location of the first permanent settlement of Acadians in Louisiana began to be referred to as the "River Parishes". The River Parishes are those parishes in Louisiana between New Orleans and Baton Rouge that span both banks of the Mississippi River, and are part of the larger Acadiana region. Traditionally they are considered to be St. Charles Parish, St. James Parish, and St. John the Baptist Parish.

Industry came to St. Charles Parish in the early 20th century as the energy industry moved to the east bank of the parish to access the Mississippi River, rail and air services. In 1914, land in Destrehan was sold to the Mexican Petroleum Company, which began operating an oil refinery in 1918, marking the first appearance of heavy industry in the parish. In 1916, the New Orleans Refining Company purchased land in what was then Sellers, leading to the town to be renamed Norco. Additional industrial facilities in the energy industry or supporting the industry were built in New Sarpy, Good Hope, and St. Rose.

In 1921, the "Little Red Church" burned and St. Charles Borromeo Church was built on the property that same year with the formal dedication taking place on January 25, 1922.

In 1924, the first public high schools in the parish opened. Destrehan High School opened on the east bank and Hahnville High School opened on the west bank of the parish.

Since the establishment of the German Coast, levees were the responsibility of landowners and breaches in these levees called "crevasses" were always a major concern due to the extensive flooding they caused. Previous crevasses in the areas of Hymelia and Bonnet Carré caused extensive damage to the area. Another crevasse during the Great Mississippi Flood of 1927 between the towns of Montz and LaPlace badly damaged Montz. Flood Control Acts had previously been passed, but because of the size of the devastation in Arkansas, Mississippi and Louisiana, authorization of the Mississippi River and Tributaries Project in the Flood Control Act of 1928 was passed. The act called for the “levees only” policy that failed to be discarded and allowed for improved levees and floodways or "spillways" to be built.

Between 1929 and 1931, the Bonnet Carré Spillway, a flood control structure was built and allows floodwaters from the Mississippi River to flow into Lake Pontchartrain. This site was chosen because four major crevasses had previously occurred at this location.

The first appearance of industry on the west bank came in 1952 when the Lion Oil Company began construction of their facility in Luling. In 1955, Royal Dutch Shell opened the Shell Chemical Plant in Norco after their forerunner, Shell Petroleum Corporation, previously acquired the New Orleans Refining Company oil refinery in 1929.

The 1960s saw a new industry come to St. Charles Parish as grain elevators were built in Ama and Destrehan. Additionally, chemical plants were built in Taft in the 1960s. In 1963, Our Lady of the Holy Rosary Catholic Church moved to Hahnville with the building being completed in 1964.

In 1971, the Louisiana State Legislature officially recognized 22 Louisiana parishes, including St. Charles Parish, and "other parishes of similar cultural environment" for their "strong French Acadian cultural aspects" (House Concurrent Resolution No. 496, June 6, 1971, authored by Carl W. Bauer of St. Mary Parish), and made the "Heart of Acadiana" the official name of the region. The public, however, prefers the one-word place name Acadiana to refer to the region. The official term appears on regional maps and highway markers.

On October 20, 1976, the MV George Prince ferry disaster occurred on the Mississippi River. The Luling–Destrehan Ferry George Prince was struck by the Norwegian tanker . Ninety-six passengers and crew were aboard the ferry when it was struck, and seventy-eight perished. On October 6, 1983, seven-years after the ferry disaster, the Hale Boggs Memorial Bridge opened. The bridge, originally named the Luling–Destrehan Bridge, connected the east bank and west bank of the parish by bridge for the first time. 1983 also saw the end of ferry service in the parish, marking the first time since the 1800s this service was not available.

In 1985, the Louisiana Power and Light Company began operation of the Waterford Nuclear Generating Station on Charles Frédérique d'Arensbourg's original land grant of Karlstein.

21st century
On September 5, 2000, the town of Good Hope was annexed by Norco. This was the eventual result of a 1983 buyout of all residential and commercial property by Good Hope Refinery; the town is listed as a ghost town. Also in 2000, Taft had a population of zero residents and is now also listed as a ghost town.

On March 26, 2002, the Davis Pond Freshwater Diversion Project dedication ceremony was held near Luling after construction began on the project in 1997. In 2007, the East Bank Hurricane Protection Levee was completed. The levee protects the majority of the east bank from Lake Pontchartrain and Labranche Wetlands flood waters.

On August 29, 2021, St. Charles Parish was devastated by Hurricane Ida. Parish President Matthew Jewel stated that "Nearly every structure in the parish has damage ranging from cosmetic damage to a total collapse of a home or building."

Geography

Bodies of water
 Bayou des Allemands
 Lac des Allemands
 Lake Cataouatche
 Lake Pontchartrain
 Lake Salvador
 Mississippi River

National protected areas
 Bonnet Carré Spillway

State protected areas
 Salvador Wildlife Management Area
 Timken Wildlife Management Area

Adjacent parishes
 Jefferson Parish  (east)
 Lafourche Parish  (southwest)
 St. John the Baptist Parish  (northwest)

Communities

Census-designated places 

 Ama
 Bayou Gauche
 Boutte
 Des Allemands (partial)
 Destrehan
 Hahnville (parish seat)
 Killona
 Luling
 Montz
 New Sarpy
 Norco
 Paradis
 St. Rose

Unincorporated communities
 Almedia
 Frellsen
 Gypsy‡
‡This populated place also has portions in an adjacent parish or parishes

Ghost towns
 Good 
Hope 
 Taft

Former populated areas
 Augsburg
 Hoffen
 Karlstein
 Marienthal

Demographics

At the 2020 United States census, there were 52,549 people, 19,212 households, and 14,463 families residing in the parish. At the 2019 American Community Survey, there were 52,773 people and 19,212 households in the parish. Of the population, 7.1% spoke another language other than English at home; the second most spoken language in the parish was Spanish.

In 2019, the racial and ethnic makeup of St. Charles was 69.2% non-Hispanic white, 26.6% Black and African American, 0.4% American Indian and Alaska Native, 1.0% Asian alone, 1.7% some other race, and 1.0% two or more races. Hispanic and Latin Americans of any race made up 6.1% of the population. An estimated 3.3% of the population were foreign-born. In 2020, its makeup was 62.24% non-Hispanic white, 24.78% Black or African American, 0.41% American Indian and Alaska Native, 1.06% Asian, 0.04% Pacific Islander, 3.59% two or more races or of some other race, and 7.88% Hispanic or Latin American of any race.

The median age was 37.9, and 6.2% of the parish was aged 5 and under. Of the 19,212 households in 2019, there were 20,710 housing units spread throughout the parish, and 4,349 corporations. Approximately 80.7% of the parish lived in owner-occupied units, and the median housing value was $207,700. The median gross rent was $978. St. Charles had a median household income of $69,019 and 15.1% lived at or below the poverty line. Among the population, males had a median income of $43,589 versus $43,022 for females, closing the gender pay gap.

In common with much of southern Louisiana, Christianity through the Roman Catholic Church has been the largest religious group for the parish. Its Catholic population numbered 21,947 at the 2020 study by the Association of Religion Data Archives. Following, Southern Baptists, National Baptists, and Full Gospel Baptists were the largest Protestant groups, though non/inter-denominational Protestantism numbered 1,440.

Education

Primary and secondary education

Public
St. Charles Parish Public Schools operates public schools in St. Charles Parish.

Upper secondary education
 Destrehan High School
 Hahnville High School

Private
 St. Charles Borromeo School

Colleges and universities
St. Charles Parish is in the service area of Delgado Community College.

Government
St. Charles Parish is governed by an executive branch and legislative branch. The executive branch is headed by the elected Parish President; currently Matthew Jewell.

The legislative branch consists of an elected nine-member council. The parish is divided into seven single-member districts, each of which is represented by an elected district council member. In addition, two at-large seats are elected on a parish-wide basis. The at-large seats are divided into an "A" seat and a "B" seat.  The "A" seat representative must be a resident of the parish's east bank while the "B" seat must be held by a resident of the west bank. The last parish council election was in October / November 2019.

Members of the St. Charles Parish Council as of January 2020:

Politics

Healthcare and emergency medical services

Hospitals
 St. Charles Parish Hospital

Law
As parish seat, Hahnville is the site of the parish courthouse.

Judicial district
St. Charles Parish comprises the 29th Judicial District, Louisiana.

Law enforcement
 St. Charles Parish Sheriff's Office

Transportation

Airports
 Louis Armstrong New Orleans International Airport
 St. Charles Airport

Highways and roads

Interstates
  Interstate 10
  Future Interstate 49
  Interstate 310

Major highways
  U.S. Highway 61
  U.S. Highway 90
  Louisiana Highway 18
  Louisiana Highway 48
 Louisiana Highway 628
  Louisiana Highway 3127

Major vehicular bridges
 Hale Boggs Memorial Bridge
 I-10 Bonnet Carré Spillway Bridge
 LaBranche Wetlands Bridge
 U.S. 61 Bonnet Carré Spillway Bridge

Railroads

Rail
 Amtrak
 Canadian National Railway
 Kansas City Southern Railway

Major railroad bridges
 CNR Bonnet Carré Spillway-Baton Rouge Bridge
 CNR Bonnet Carré Spillway-McComb Bridge
 Kansas City Southern Bonnet Carré Spillway Bridge

Notable people

 Darren Barbier, Luling, former head football coach at Nicholls State University
 Alfred Blue, Boutte, NFL running back
 Paul F. Boudreau, Destrehan, NFL and CFL assistant coach
 David Butler, Good Hope, sculptor and painter
 LaRon Byrd, Hahnville, NFL wide receiver
 Mutt Carey, Hahnville, jazz trumpeter
 Joel T. Chaisson, II, Destrehan, State Senate president from 2008 to 2012 and district attorney
 Barbara Colley, Luling, romance and mystery writer
 Charles Frederick d’Arensbourg, leader of the German Coast settlement 
 Dana "Pokey" Chatman, Ama, WNBA head coach, former LSU women's basketball coach
 Burnell Dent, St. Rose, NFL linebacker
 Jean Noel Destréhan, Destrehan, U.S. Senator
 Jesse Duplantis, Destrehan, televangelist
 Snooks Eaglin, St. Rose, guitarist and singer 
 Roy Ebron, St. Rose, ABA basketball player
 Hoffman Franklin Fuller, Destrehan, professor-emeritus at Tulane University Law School and Bossier City mayor
 Michael Hahn, Hahnville, 19th Governor of Louisiana and U.S. Representative
 Minor Hall, Norco, jazz drummer
 Tubby Hall, Norco, jazz drummer
 Shelley Hennig, St. Rose and Destrehan, actress and Miss Teen USA
 Jordan Jefferson, St. Rose, NFL quarterback
 Justin Jefferson, St. Rose, NFL wide receiver
 Curtis Johnson, St. Rose, head football coach at Tulane University and NFL assistant coach
 Damaris Johnson, Norco, NFL wide receiver
 Jamall Johnson, Norco, NFL linebacker and actor
 Dawan Landry, Ama, NFL safety
 LaRon Landry, Ama, NFL safety
 Sabrina Le Beauf, Ama, actress
 Beulah Levy Ledner, St. Rose, dessert and pastry chef
 Tanner Lee, Destrehan, NFL quarterback
 Mary Ann Vial Lemmon, Hahnville, U.S. federal judge
 Glen Logan, Destrehan, NFL defensive tackle
 Chris Markey, Luling, college and professional running back
 Rondell Mealey, Norco, NFL running back
 Kirk Merritt, Destrehan, NFL wide receiver
 Gregory A. Miller, Norco, attorney in Destrehan and state representative
 Ralph R. Miller, Norco, state representative
 Jerico Nelson, New Sarpy, NFL safety
 George T. Oubre, Norco, state senator
 Jeremy Parquet, Norco, NFL offensive lineman
 Rusty Rebowe, Norco, NFL linebacker
 Tim Rebowe, Norco, head football coach at Nicholls State University
 Ed Reed, St. Rose and Destrehan, NFL safety, member of the Pro Football Hall of Fame
 Darius Reynaud, Luling, NFL wide receiver
 Darryl Richard, St. Rose, NFL defensive lineman
 Garland Robinette, Boutte, journalist and news anchor
 Mike Scifres, Destrehan, NFL punter
 Darrington Sentimore, Norco, NFL defensive lineman
 Gary Smith, Jr., Norco, state senator
 Margaret Taylor-Burroughs, St. Rose, co-founder of the DuSable Museum of African American History
 Gary Tyler, St. Rose, who is believed to have been wrongly convicted of murder in 1974. He was released in 2016.
 Josh Victorian, St. Rose, NFL cornerback
 Darius Vinnett, St. Rose, NFL cornerback
 Devon Walker, Destrehan, Tulane and NFL safety
 Michael Young Jr., St. Rose, NFL wide receiver

See also
 Acadiana
 Bonnet Carré Spillway
 German Coast
 1811 German Coast uprising, largest slave rebellion in U.S. history
 Hale Boggs Memorial Bridge
 National Register of Historic Places listings in St. Charles Parish, Louisiana
 New Orleans-Metairie-Hammond, LA-MS CSA
 New Orleans metropolitan area
 River Parishes

References

External links 
Government
 St. Charles Parish government's website
 St Charles Parish Sheriff's Office

Geology
 McCulloh, R. P., P. V. Heinrich, and J. Snead, 2003, Ponchatoula 30 x 60 minute geologic quadrangle. Louisiana Geological Survey, Baton Rouge, Louisiana.

Hydrology
 White, V.E., 2015, Water resources of St. Charles Parish, Louisiana U.S. Geological Survey.

 
Saint Charles Parish
Parishes in Acadiana
Saint Charles Parish
Saint Charles Parish
Louisiana parishes on the Mississippi River
1807 establishments in the Territory of Orleans
Populated places established in 1807